Presidente Perón International Airport  is an airport in Neuquén Province, Argentina, serving the cities of Neuquén, Cipolletti, Plottier, Centenario, and General Roca. The airport is on the west side of Neuquén, a city at the confluence of the Limay and Neuquén Rivers.

Overview
The airport is suitable for landing large aircraft such as the Boeing 757 or the Boeing 767. It has seven hangars, an Instrument landing system, and Precision Approach Path Indicator (PAPI) system.

Airlines and destinations

Accidents and incidents
 18 May 2011: Sol Líneas Aéreas Flight 5428 – On a Córdoba-Mendoza-Neuquén-Comodoro Rivadavia route which crashed shortly after takeoff, killing everyone onboard.

See also

Transport in Argentina
List of airports in Argentina

References

External links

American Jet s.a. 

Neuquén
Airports in Neuquén Province